The Diocese of Dundo is a Latin Catholic ecclesiastical territory or diocese of the Catholic Church in Angola. In 2016, it had 366,700 baptised out of 800,000 inhabitants. It is governed by Bishop Estanislau Marques Chindekasse S.V.D. Its episcopal see is the city of Dundo. The Diocese of Dundo is a suffragan diocese in the ecclesiastical province of the metropolitan Archdiocese of Saurímo in Angola.

Lands 
The episcopal see is the city of Dundo, where the cathedra is found in the Cathedral of Our Lady of the Immaculate Conception. The territory is divided into 10 parishes.

History
 On 9 November 2001, the diocese was erected from territory of the Roman Catholic Diocese of Saurimo (today an archdiocese). It was originally a suffragan of the Archdiocese of Luanda. 
 On 12 April 2011, it became part of the ecclesiastical province of the archdiocese of Saurimo.

Leadership
 Bishops of Dundo (Roman rite), in reverse chronological order
 Bishop Estanislau Marques Chindekasse, S.V.D. (22 December 2012 - ...)
 Bishop José Manuel Imbamba (6 October 2008  – 12 April 2011), appointed Archbishop of Saurimo
 Bishop Joaquim Ferreira Lopes, O.F.M. Cap. (9 November 2001  – 6 June 2007), appointed Bishop of Viana

Statistics

See also
Roman Catholicism in Angola

Sources
 GCatholic.org

Roman Catholic dioceses in Angola
Christian organizations established in 2001
Roman Catholic dioceses and prelatures established in the 21st century
Roman Catholic Ecclesiastical Province of Saurímo
2001 establishments in Angola